Chrysanthemum × morifolium (also known as florist's daisy and hardy garden mum, or in China, 菊花  júhuā) is a hybrid species of perennial plant from family Asteraceae.

Botanical history

In China, they have been around since 500 BCE. In 1630, more than 500 varieties were already mentioned there. In Europe, especially in Holland, they have been known since the mid-17th century, but their general dissemination took place only in the 19th century. Chrysanthemum was first appreciated in China as a medicinal plant.

It is classified in the oldest Chinese medical material, Shennong Ben Cao Jing (early modern era), in the category of superior drugs and is part of the products related to the search for immortality. "In prolonged use, it lifts the inhibition of blood and qi, alleviates the body, slows down ageing, and prolongs life" says the classic. "Lightening the body" was a goal to reach the ethereal state of Immortals able to fly and "ride the clouds". From Jin and Tang dynasties (around the 5th century AD), chrysanthemum began to be appreciated as an ornamental plant, while continuing to be used for dietary reasons.

The first monograph on chrysanthemums  was published in 1104 CE. Liu Meng, the author of a "Chrysanthemum Treatise", classifies the chrysanthemums according to their colors: the normal ones are yellow, then come the whites, the purples and finally the reds. It lists a total of 35 cultivated varieties that could be observed in the gardens near the Buddhist shrines of Longmen Grottoes. In the 16th century, the famous physician and herbalist Li Shizhen in his Great Treaty of Medical Matter, reports a hundred cultivars. He attributes to them some medicinal properties such as "eliminating heat and toxins", "improving visual acuity" and so on. In 1630, a survey of over 500 cultivars 17 and about 2000 at the beginning of 20th century.

The first European author to mention chrysanthemum is Jacobus Breynius (Jacob Breyn) in 1689 in his Prodromus Plantarum Rariorum. This merchant and botanist describes the Matricaria japonica maxima, as a very elegant flowering plant, double, pink or light red 20 and existing in several varieties. The first botanical description of the florists' chrysanthemum goes to Thomas d'Audibert de Ramatuelle. In 1792, in the Journal of Natural History, this botanist describes the cultivated plant, with big purpurine flowers, brought back from China by the navigator Marseillais Blancard, under the names of "Camomile with large flowers", Anthemis grandiflora. He insists on distinguishing it from the Chrysanthemum indicum of Linnaeus with small yellow heads. He proposes in a note to call it also Chrysanthemum morifolium. From this first cultivated plant brought back from China in 1789 by Blancard, then from those brought back (from China in 1846 and Japan in 1863) will be created in Europe thousands of cultivars and hybrids. Joined thousands of cultivars developed independently in China and Japan, there is currently a huge complex cultivars (estimated from 20,000 to 30,000).

Horticulturalist Wilhelm Miller wrote, "The common chrysanthemums of the florists (C. hortorum) are often called 'large-flowering' and 'autumn chrysanthemums,' to distinguish them from the hardy outdoor species. They are the blended product of C. indicum and C. morifolium, two species of plants that grow wild in China and Japan. The outdoor or hardy chrysanthemums are derived from the same species, being less developed forms. The florist's chrysanthemum is not necessarily a glasshouse subject."

The more than 1,000 varieties that have existed in Europe since the 19th century are divided into numerous varieties. The indicum hybrids as the oldest group have the chrysanthemum chrysanthemum (Chrysanthemum indicum) as the parent.

Description

The stems stand upright. The lower leaves are plumed, further up the stems they are increasingly entire. Deciduous leaves appear in the spring. They are alternate, lobed pinnatifid and toothed. They are up to 12 cm long, fleshy and covered with gray hairs. They exhale a strong smell when they are wrinkled.

The plant's texture is thick and leathery.  The many branches, which are silky and covered with a short down, form a dense tuft. The typical flower heads are radiated, that is to say formed of peripheral florets, female, zygomorphous, with ligules and central florets actinomorphous, tubulated, bisexual. The external bracts are herbaceous, with a narrow scariety margin.

In complex total inflorescences are some to many cup-shaped partial inflorescences together. The tongue flowers can have in the many varieties of colors of green, white, or yellow, pink to purple. There are varieties with simple flowers that look like daisies and varieties with double flowers, looking like pompoms more or less big. The plant starts to bloom when the length of the day is less than 14 hours.

To note, during the millennia and a half of cultivation, tens of thousands of different cultivars have been obtained, with flower heads of very different shapes, sizes and colors. It is mainly by looking at the leaves that one can know that it is a chrysanthemum.

Cultivation and uses

This plant can be noted for its popularity as an indoor houseplant in part because of its air cleaning qualities as per a study done by NASA, removing trichloroethylene, benzene, formaldehyde, ammonia, and other chemicals from the air. In general, the plant is best fertilized once a month and watered two to three times a week depending on climate. In terms of stems produced per year in 1997, Japan was by far the largest producer with 2 billion stalks, followed by the Netherlands (800 million), Colombia (600 million), Italy (500 million). C. × morifolium'' is hardy to USDA zones 5–9.

Medicine
In natural medicine the "flower" is used against eye inflammation and impure skin. It also applies as an air purifier.

Contact with parts of plants may in some cases cause skin irritation and allergies.

Ecology
The plant is eaten by various aphids, capsid bugs, earwigs, leaf miners, nematodes, spider mites, thrips, and whiteflies. The plant can die from various diseases which include aster yellows, Botrytis, leaf spots, rust, powdery mildew, verticillium wilt, and rotting of stem and roots, and even viruses.

Gallery

References

Bibliography 

 
 
 

morifolium
Medicinal plants
Ornamental plants
Flora of China
Flora of Japan